Người giấu mặt is a Vietnamese version of the Big Brother reality television show based on the Dutch television series of the same name originally created in 1997 by John de Mol's company Endemol. The show is based on a group of strangers, known as Housemates, living together twenty-four hours a day in the "Big Brother" house, isolated from the outside world but under constant surveillance with no privacy for five months more.

The show was launched on VTV6's primetime block from November 12, 2013 and concluded on January 14, 2014. Twelve strangers originally have the first meeting, and later one more housemate was introduced after ones leaving.

After nearly 11 years rekindled the idea of bringing Big Brother to Vietnam, VTV6 and coordinate production BHD, Vietnamese version called Người giấu mặt. The first live show officially aired on VTV6 at 19:55 on Tuesday, November 12. With a prize for the winner is 2 billion. At this point, there is no reality TV program in Vietnam does have large metal awards show as Người giấu mặt. Also according to the manufacturer's representatives BHD, this program also holds the first place on the level of cost and complexity than mass reality TV show world's most famous BHD has taken other show. The production crew of up to 150 people at 12 international experts. More than 40 cameras, camera equipment from automatic robot hand to be requisitioned.

There are no plans for future seasons due to the government's new policy for television.

In 2016, the 7th Season of Pinoy Big Brother used this house and was redecorated especially for that season.

Housemates

Nominations table 

 : Thảo and Trang received an extra vote due to rule breaking.
 : Bửu won a challenge in the weekly task and had one positive point to add to his total.
 : This week, housemates nominated 3 other housemates instead of 2.

Nominations total received

References

External links
List of broadcasts of Vietnam Television (VTV)

https://web.archive.org/web/20131109064538/http://www.bigbrothervietnam2013.com/
https://web.archive.org/web/20131109014558/http://www.nguoigiaumat.vtv.vn/

Vietnamese television series
Vietnam Television original programming
2010s Vietnamese television series
2013 Vietnamese television series debuts